The speckled dace (Rhinichthys osculus), also known as the spotted dace and the carpita pinta, is a member of the minnow family. It is found in temperate freshwater in North America, from Sonora, Mexico to British Columbia, Canada.

Canada is the northern limit of the speckled dace's distribution, and there it is found only in isolated parts of the Kettle and Granby Rivers. It is possible that, along with the Salish sucker (Catostomus sp.), the speckled dace was one of the first fish to recolonize the rivers of British Columbia following the Ice Age. It is believed that spawning in Canada occurs once a year during the summer in fish older than two years. During breeding, many males often accompany a single female who broadcasts adhesive eggs over the gravelly stream bed. Each female produces between 200 and 500 eggs. Speckled dace are omnivorous, feeding upon filamentous algae and other plant material, bottom-dwelling aquatic insects and zooplankton.

Canadian populations of the fish were last sampled in 1977, and then only 400 individuals were collected. Few of the fish caught were adults, suggesting that speckled dace mortality may be high. However, not enough data is available to determine accurately whether the population is self-sustaining or in decline. In Canada, the speckled dace is threatened by its limited habitat and by seasonal flooding.

There are several subspecies, including:
R. o. larversi - Big Smoky Valley speckled dace
R. o. lethoporus - Independence Valley speckled dace
R. o. moapae - Moapa speckled dace
R. o. nevadensis - Ash Meadows speckled dace
R. o. oligoporus - Clover Valley speckled dace
R. o. thermalis - Kendall Warm Springs dace
R. o. velifer - Pahranagat speckled dace
R. o. ssp - Foskett speckled dace
R. o. ssp - Santa Ana speckled dace
R. o. ssp - Owens speckled dace
R. o. ssp - Amargosa Canyon speckled dace
R. o. ssp - Oasis Valley speckled dace
R. o. ssp - Long Valley speckled dace
R. o. ssp - Meadow Valley Wash speckled dace
R. o. ssp - White River speckled dace
R. o. ssp - Monitor Valley speckled dace

The Foskett speckled dace, found in "harsh conditions" of the desert waters of the Great Basin spanning parts of Southeastern Oregon and Nevada, has been listed as threatened under the Endangered Species Act since 1985. From 2011 through 2016, the fish's population fluctuated from a low of 1,728 to a high of 24,888. Prior to listing, the population was estimated to be 1,500 to 2,000.  In 2018, U.S. Fish and Wildlife Service officials proposed removing federal protections. Robyn Thorson, the Service's pacific region director, said in a statement; "We attribute this impressive accomplishment to our partners who have worked so hard on the recovery of the dace.  This news builds on other recent successes, including two Oregon fishes that were delisted due to recovery, the Oregon chub and the Modoc sucker."

References

 Department of Fisheries and Oceans, Canada, website information on Aquatic Species at Risk.
 https://www.fws.gov/oregonfwo/Species/Data/FoskettSpeckledDace/ Species Fact Sheet / Foskett speckled dace / Rhinichthys osculus ssp.

Rhinichthys
Taxa named by Charles Frédéric Girard
Fish described in 1856